The Tree is a 2014 Slovenian drama film written and directed by Sonja Prosenc. It film was selected as the Slovenian entry for the Best Foreign Language Film at the 88th Academy Awards but it was not nominated.

Cast
 Katarina Stegnar
 Jernej Kogovsek
 Lukas Matija Rosas Ursic

See also
 List of submissions to the 88th Academy Awards for Best Foreign Language Film
 List of Slovenian submissions for the Academy Award for Best Foreign Language Film

References

External links
 

2014 films
2014 drama films
Slovene-language films
Slovenian drama films